Tricarbonylbis(triphenylphosphine)iron(0)  is a coordination complex with the formula Fe(CO)3(PPh3)2 (Ph = C6H5).  A yellow solid, this complex is derived from iron pentacarbonyl by replacement of two carbonyl ligands by triphenylphosphine (PPh3).

Strynthesis and reactions
The title complex can be prepared by reaction of triiron dodecacarbonyl with excess triphenylphosphine:

(Triphenylphosphine)iron tetracarbonyl is an intermediate in the synthesis of this compound. The title complex can also be produced more efficiently by borohydride-catalyzed substitution of iron pentacarbonyl. 

Protonation gives the ferrous hydride:

Both the mono- and bis(triphenylphosphine) complexes were originally described by Walter Reppe.

References

Triphenylphosphine complexes
Coordination complexes
Carbonyl complexes
Iron compounds